SS Indus was a 3,393-ton steamship launched on 28 April 1904. Delivered to the Nourse Line in May 1904, she was the shipping company's first steamship. She was built by Charles Connell & Company Limited, Glasgow and had single screw, triple expansion, 425 nhp engines.

Voyages 
Like other Nourse Line ships, she was primarily used for the transportation of Indian indentured labourers to the colonies. Details of some of these voyages are as follows:

Sinking 
Emden sank her by scuttling and gunfire at position  after having taken aboard all her complement. Her crew were later transferred to the German collier Markomania.

See also 
 Indian Indenture Ships to Fiji
 Indian indenture system

External links 

History of Suriname
History of Guyana
Indian indentureship in Trinidad and Tobago
Indian indenture ships to Fiji
World War I shipwrecks in the Indian Ocean
1904 ships
Maritime incidents in September 1914
Ships of the Nourse Line
Passenger ships of the United Kingdom
Steamships of the United Kingdom